Ludovina Dias de Oliveira (born 26 April 1955) is a Mozambican former athlete. She competed in the women's discus throw at the 1980 Summer Olympics.

References

External links
 

1955 births
Living people
Athletes (track and field) at the 1980 Summer Olympics
Mozambican female discus throwers
Olympic athletes of Mozambique
Place of birth missing (living people)